The Vaalkop Dam is a combined gravity and earth-fill type dam located in North West Province, South Africa. Its reservoir is located at the confluence of the Elands River and the Hex River, part of the Crocodile basin. The dam was established originally in 1972 and was renovated in 2008 in order to supply water for the platinum and associated metals mining operations in the area. The dam mainly serves for irrigation purposes, municipal water supply and industrial uses. The hazard potential of the dam has been ranked high.

The Vaalkop Dam lies near Pilanesberg,  ESE from the outer perimeter of the ancient crater formation.

See also
List of reservoirs and dams in South Africa

References

External links
R264m water scheme flows on
Vaalkop Dam Nature Reserve
Vaalkop Dam Species Diversity Report, October 2009

Dams in South Africa
Dams completed in 2010
Crocodile River (Limpopo)
Buildings and structures in North West (South African province)
21st-century architecture in South Africa